The  (Spanish for salad) is a genre of polyphonic secular music mixing languages and dialects and nonsensical quodlibets.

The term is known mainly through a publication,  Prague (1581), by Mateo Flecha the Younger, that contains six long four-part vocal compositions by his uncle Mateo Flecha (1481–1553). Each of these  is divided into several sections, ranging from seven to twelve. The music is for four voices.

There is also an instrumental  for organ by Sebastián Aguilera de Heredia.

Works
  
Prague 1581
 El Fuego (the fire) – Flecha
 La Bomba (the pump) – Flecha
 La Negrina (the black girl) – Flecha
 La Guerra (the battle) – Flecha
 El Bon Jorn (the good day) – Vila
 La Justa (the joust) – Flecha
 La Viuda (the widow) – Flecha
 La Feria (the fair) – Flecha (the younger)
 Las Cañas (the pan-pipas) – Flecha (the younger)
 La Trulla - Càrceres
 La Lucha (the struggle) – Vila
 Los Chistes (the jokes) – Flecha
 Las Cañas II (the pan-pipes II) – Flecha
 El Molino (the mill) – Chacón
 
Supplement
 El Jubilate – Flecha
 La Caza (the hunt) – Flecha
 El Toro (the bull) – Flecha
 La Negrina (the black woman) – Cárceres
 Las Cañas III (the pan-pipes III) – Brudieu

Francisco de Peñalosa
 Por las sierras de Madrid, for 6 voices.
 Tú que vienes de camino, for 2 voices.
Garcimuñóz (attributed)
 Una montaña pasando, for 4 voices

Anon.
 Quien madruga Dios le ayuda. Romancero 1612

Sources

Manuscripts
 Barcelona, Biblioteca de Catalunya, Ms 454 (Cancionero de Barcelona).
 Barcelona, Biblioteca de Catalunya. Ms 588 I
 Barcelona, Biblioteca de Catalunya. Ms 588 II.
 Cancionero de Medinaceli Palma de Mallorca, Fundación Bartolomé March

Printed editions
 Cancionero de Uppsala. Villancicos de diversos autores. Jerónimo Scotto. Venecia. 1556
 Las ensaladas de Flecha. Mateo Flecha el joven. Editor: Lorge Negrino. Praga. 1581. (only bass survives)
 Le difficile de Chansons. Second Livre. Jacques Moderne. Lyon. La justa, titled La Bataille en Spagnol.

Transcriptions for voice and vihuela
 Orphénica Lyra, Miguel de Fuenllana.
 Silva de Sirenas, Enríquez de Valderrábano.
 Libro de música de vihuela, Diego Pisador.

References
 Historia de la Música en España e Hispanoamérica 2. De los Reyes Católicos a Felipe II, Maricarmen Gómez (ed.). Madrid-México D.F., Fondo de Cultura Económica, 2012 (chapters II-III). 

Early music
Spanish music
Polyphonic singing
Multilingual mass media
Derivative works